Víctor Manuel Castellanos Barrios (20 April 1934 – 21 February 1999) was a Guatemalan sports shooter. He competed at the 1968 Summer Olympics and the 1972 Summer Olympics.

References

External links
 

1934 births
1999 deaths
Guatemalan male sport shooters
Olympic shooters of Guatemala
Shooters at the 1968 Summer Olympics
Shooters at the 1972 Summer Olympics
Sportspeople from Guatemala City
Pan American Games medalists in shooting
Pan American Games gold medalists for Guatemala
Shooters at the 1967 Pan American Games
Shooters at the 1971 Pan American Games
Medalists at the 1971 Pan American Games